The Rega is a river in north-western Poland, flowing into the Baltic Sea. It is the country's 24th longest river, with a total length of 188 km and a catchment area of 2,767 km2.

Towns
The following towns are situated on the Rega:

Tributaries
The following rivers are tributaries of the Rega:
Brzeźnicka Węgorza
Gardominka
Mołstowa

Images

See also
List of rivers in Poland

References 

 
Rivers of Poland
Rivers of West Pomeranian Voivodeship